Delma Gonçalves (born 19 May 1975), commonly known as Pretinha, is a Brazilian professional soccer coach and former forward. A longtime member of the Brazil national team, for whom she debuted in 1991, she played for clubs in Brazil, the United States and Japan before moving to Icheon Daekyo of South Korea's WK-League in 2009.

With the Brazilian national team, Pretinha participated in four World Cups; in China (1991), Sweden (1995), United States (1999), and China (2007). She has also played in four Olympic Games; in Atlanta (1996), Sydney (2000), Athens (2004) and Beijing (2008). She won silver medals from the 2004 and 2008 Olympic tournaments.

Club career
As a child, Pretinha had played football with her brothers on the streets of Rio. She joined her first club Mendanha Futebol Clube at the age of 14. After being elevated to the Brazil national team, she was signed by the female section of Vasco da Gama. At the time of the 1999 Women's World Cup in the United States, Pretinha was earning around $3,400 per month from her contract with Vasco.

When the American professional Women's United Soccer Association (WUSA) started in 2001, Pretinha and compatriot Roseli were assigned to Washington Freedom in the inaugural draft. Pretinha scored the only goal in the league's first ever match; a second half penalty kick at the Bay Area CyberRays. With four goals in her first five games Pretinha led the early season scoring charts, she finished the campaign with five goals having played in all 21 league games. At the end of the inaugural season Washington traded Pretinha to the CyberRays.

During her first season with her new club in 2002, coach Ian Sawyers handed Pretinha a deeper midfield role. In June 2003 she scored twice at Washington Freedom to salvage a draw for the CyberRays against her old club. The team's top-goalscorer, Pretinha missed the culmination of the CyberRays' 2003 campaign after tearing the anterior cruciate ligament in her right knee during an international friendly between Brazil and the United States in July 2003.

With the collapse of WUSA and the lack of structure in Brazil women's football, Pretinha was without a club while recuperating from her injury. She played in the Athens Olympics as a free agent, then joined Japanese L. League team INAC Kobe Leonessa in 2005. In March 2009 she joined Icheon Daekyo, becoming the first foreign professional to join the new WK-League in South Korea.

International career

When the Brazil women's national football team were preparing for the inaugural 1991 FIFA Women's World Cup, they played a training match against a Liga Desportiva de Nova Iguaçu (LDNI) select team containing a 16-year-old Pretinha. Brazil won easily but Pretinha excelled to the extent that she was added to the national team panel for the World Cup. The aeroplane journey to Guangdong in China was the first time that the young Pretinha had travelled outside the state of Rio.

In China Pretinha featured in Brazil's last two group games; being unused in the 1–0 win over Japan then playing as a substitute in defeats by the United States (0–5) and Sweden (0–2). The Brazil women's national team did not play another match for over three years, until a sponsorship from Maizena corn starch allowed them to play in the 1995 South American Women's Football Championship. Pretinha remained in the squad, one of 10 Vasco players to be included, and scored six goals in Brazil's successful campaign.

At the 1995 FIFA Women's World Cup in Sweden, Pretinha scored in a 2–1 defeat by Japan. Brazil finished at the bottom of Group A, but qualified for the 1996 Atlanta Olympics on account of England having no agreement to represent Great Britain. At the Olympics Pretinha was the joint-top goalscorer with four goals, as Brazil finished in fourth place after a 3–2 defeat in the bronze medal match by Norway.

Still playing for Vasco da Gama, Pretinha remained a key player for Brazil at the 1999 FIFA Women's World Cup. A tournament preview on the SoccerTimes.com website pointed out she had scored two goals in each of her previous two games and called her: "a force at midfield or forward". She was a member of the Brazil team that participated in the 2000 Sydney Olympics and again finished in fourth place.

The knee injury sustained by Pretinha in July 2003 ruled her out of Brazil's squad for the 2003 FIFA Women's World Cup. Despite being without a club, she was restored to the national team for the 2004 Athens Olympics. She scored in both the 1–0 semi-final win over Sweden and the 2–1 overtime final defeat by the United States, as Brazil collected silver medals.

She remained in the national selection for the 2007 Pan American Games, but was predominantly a reserve player. She was disappointed not to start the final, staged at Maracanã Stadium in her home city, but did come on as a late substitute. As an experienced 32-year-old veteran, she was called up for her fourth World Cup  in 2007. She was a substitute in the final, which Brazil lost 2–0 to Germany.

Pretinha participated at the 2008 Beijing Olympics. She won another silver medal when Brazil lost the final 1–0 after extra time to the United States. That was her final contribution at national team level, until she was called up six years later, aged 39, for a friendly match in France.

Coaching career
In February 2022 Pretinha became an assistant coach at her former club Vasco da Gama.

Notes

References

External links
 
 

1975 births
Living people
Brazilian women's footballers
Women's association football midfielders
Footballers from Rio de Janeiro (city)
Olympic footballers of Brazil
Olympic silver medalists for Brazil
Footballers at the 1996 Summer Olympics
Footballers at the 2000 Summer Olympics
Footballers at the 2004 Summer Olympics
Footballers at the 2008 Summer Olympics
Footballers at the 2007 Pan American Games
1995 FIFA Women's World Cup players
Washington Freedom players
Olympic medalists in football
1991 FIFA Women's World Cup players
1999 FIFA Women's World Cup players
2007 FIFA Women's World Cup players
Medalists at the 2008 Summer Olympics
Medalists at the 2004 Summer Olympics
INAC Kobe Leonessa players
Expatriate footballers in South Korea
Brazil women's international footballers
San Jose CyberRays players
Expatriate women's soccer players in the United States
Expatriate women's footballers in Japan
Nadeshiko League players
Women's United Soccer Association players
Brazilian expatriate women's footballers
Brazilian expatriate sportspeople in the United States
Brazilian expatriate sportspeople in Japan
Brazilian expatriate sportspeople in South Korea
Expatriate women's footballers in South Korea
WK League players
Pan American Games medalists in football
Medalists at the 2007 Pan American Games
CR Vasco da Gama (women) players
Pan American Games gold medalists for Brazil